Steadman may refer to:
 Steadman (band), a British rock band
 Steadman (surname)
 Steadman TS100, recreation of Jaguar SS100 sports car
 Barrows-Steadman Homestead
 Draper-Steadman House
 Tefft-Steadman House

See also 
 Stedman (disambiguation)
 Steedman (disambiguation)